F Scott may refer to:
F. R. Scott, Francis Reginald Scott (1899–1985), a Canadian poet, intellectual, and constitutional scholar 
F. Scott Fitzgerald, Francis Scott Key Fitzgerald (September 24, 1896 – December 21, 1940), an American novelist, essayist, short story and screenwriter
Freda Scott, a former british tennis player – see 1935 Wimbledon Championships – Women's Singles